Of the 2 South Dakota incumbents, 1 was re-elected and 1 retired.

See also 
 List of United States representatives from South Dakota
 United States House of Representatives elections, 1972

1972
South Dakota
1972 South Dakota elections